Tabun-Aral is a rural locality (a selo) in Tabun-Aralsky Selsoviet of Yenotayevsky District, Astrakhan Oblast, Russia. The population was 111 as of 2010. There are 2 streets.

Geography 
Tabun-Aral is located 39 km southeast of Yenotayevka (the district's administrative centre) by road. Lenino is the nearest rural locality.

References 

Rural localities in Yenotayevsky District